The Enescu Prize is a prize in music composition founded by Romanian composer George Enescu, awarded from 1913 to 1946, and afterwards by the National University of Music Bucharest. Enescu is regarded by many as Romania's most important musician. Winners have included Mihail Andricu and Sergiu Natra.

 1913: Ion Nonna Otescu
 1923: Mihail Andricu
 1924: Mihail Andricu
 1942: Roman Vlad – Sinfonietta
 1945: Sergiu Natra – March and Chorale for orchestra and Divertimento in Ancient Style for string orchestra
 1964: Tudor Ciortea – Din isprdvile lui Păcală (Some of Păcală's Exploits)
 1970: Pierre Amoyal
 1974: Pascal Bentoiu
 1984: Felicia Donceanu
 1995: Christian Wilhelm Berger – Inscription in Stone
 1998: Maia Ciobanu
 2001: Irina Odagescu

See also
George Enescu Festival
George Enescu International Piano Competition

References

Classical music awards
Awards established in 1913
1913 establishments in Romania